The following is a list of soundtrack releases for the Fox TV series Beverly Hills, 90210:

Beverly Hills, 90210: The Soundtrack

Beverly Hills, 90210: The Soundtrack is the first soundtrack album to the TV Show Beverly Hills, 90210, released in 1992.  Subsequent soundtrack albums were released in 1994 (Beverly Hills 90210: The College Years) and 1996 (Beverly Hills 90210: Songs from the Peach Pit).

Track listing
 "Bend Time Back Around" – Paula Abdul (Elliot Wolff)
 "Got 2 Have U" – Color Me Badd  (Color Me Badd; Howard Thompson)
 "The Right Kind of Love" –  Jeremy Jordan  (Lotti Golden, Robbie Nevil, Tommy Faragher)
 "Love Is" – Vanessa L. Williams & Brian McKnight  (John Keller; Tonio K.; Michael Caruso)
 "Just Wanna Be Your Friend" – Puck & Natty  (Amen, King Zen; Punk)
 "Let Me Be Your Baby" – Geoffrey Williams  (Geoffrey Williams; Pete Glenister)
 "Saving Forever for You" – Shanice  (Diane Warren)
 "All the Way to Heaven" – Jody Watley  (Diane Warren)
 "Why" – D Mob with Cathy Dennis  (Cathy Dennis; Danny Poku)  (S 3 E 25/30)
 "Time to Be Lovers" – Michael McDonald & Chaka Khan   (K. Miller; Tom Snow)
 "Action Speaks Louder than Words" – Tara Kemp   (K. Miller; Tom Snow)
 "Theme From Beverly Hills, 90210" – John Davis  (Davis, John E.)

This was released at the beginning of Beverly Hills, 90210s third season, although the cover art was from the second season.  The costumes that the cast was wearing are the same costumes that they wore during the episode "U4EA".  "U4EA" aired on November 14, 1991.

Singles

Beverly Hills 90210: The College Years

Track listing
 "Make It Right" – Lisa Stansfield
 "Not One More Time" – Stacy Piersa
 "Every Day of the Week" – Jade
 "Not Enough Hours in the Night" – After 7
 "S.O.S." – D Mob with Cathy Dennis
 "No Intermission" – 5th Power
 "Cantaloop (Flip Fantasia)" – Us3
 "Moving on Up" – M People
 "Touch My Light" – Big Mountain
 "I'll Love You Anyway" – Aaron Neville
 "What Your Love Means to Me" – Hi-Five
 "Forever Yours" – Wendy Moten

Release Date: September 20, 1994

This was released at the beginning of Beverly Hills, 90210s fifth season, although the cover art was from the fourth season.  The costumes that the cast was wearing were the same costumes that they wore during the episode "Twenty Years Ago Today".  "Twenty Years Ago Today" aired on October 27, 1993.

NOTE: This album was released on cassette tape as well as CD.  The cassette tape cover art features Shannen Doherty (Brenda Walsh); however, the CD cover art features Doherty's replacement, Tiffani-Amber Thiessen (Valerie Malone).

Beverly Hills 90210: Songs from the Peach Pit

Track listing
 "Devil with a Blue Dress On & Good Golly Miss Molly" - Mitch Ryder & The Detroit Wheels
 "You Really Got Me" - The Kinks
 "Satisfaction" - Otis Redding
 "Knock on Wood" - Eddie Floyd
 "B-A-B-Y" - Carla Thomas
 "The Beat Goes On" - Sonny & Cher
 "How Can I Be Sure" - The Young Rascals
 "Friday on My Mind" - The Easybeats
 "Mony Mony" - Tommy James & The Shondells
 "Pick Up the Pieces" - Average White Band
 "What You Won't Do for Love" - Bobby Caldwell
 "Slow Ride" - Foghat
 "Strange Way" - Firefall
 "Please Don't Go" - KC and the Sunshine Band
 "Beverly Hills 90210" Theme - John E. Davis

Released: October 1, 1996

Television soundtracks
1992 soundtrack albums
1994 soundtrack albums
1996 soundtrack albums
Albums produced by Brian McKnight
Beverly Hills, 90210 (franchise)